New Albany and Salem Railroad Station, also known as the Louisville and Nashville (Monon) Railroad Station, was a historic train station located at Gosport, Owen County, Indiana.  It was built between 1854 and 1858 by the New Albany and Salem Railroad.  It was a one-story, simple brick structure measuring 58 feet wide by 123 feet long. It has been demolished.

It was listed on the National Register of Historic Places in 1976 and delisted in 1983.

References

Former National Register of Historic Places in Indiana
Railway stations on the National Register of Historic Places in Indiana
Railway stations in the United States opened in 1858
Gosport
National Register of Historic Places in Owen County, Indiana
Transportation buildings and structures in Owen County, Indiana